The Red de Bibliotecas Universitarias Españolas (REBIUN; English: University Libraries Network) facilitates cooperation among academic libraries in Spain. It formed in 1988, and in 1996 absorbed the Conferencia de Directores de Bibliotecas Universitarias y Científicas Españolas (COBIDUCE).

History
Founding membership of REBIUN consisted of libraries of the Universidad de Alcalá de Henares, Universidad de Barcelona, Universidad de Cantabria, Universidad Nacional de Educación a Distancia, Universidad de Oviedo, Universidad del País Vasco, Universidad Politécnica de Catalunya, Universidad de Santiago de Compostela, and Universidad de Sevilla.

See also
 List of libraries in Spain

References

This article incorporates information from the Spanish Wikipedia.

Further reading

External links
 Official site

Libraries in Spain
1988 establishments in Spain
College and university associations and consortia in Europe
Organizations established in 1988
Non-profit organisations based in Spain